The Dambořice oil field is an oil field located in Dambořice, Hodonín District, South Moravian Region. It was discovered in 1995 and developed by Unipetrol. It began production in 1996 and produces oil.

See also

Energy in the Czech Republic

References

Oil fields in the Czech Republic
Hodonín District